LSX may refer to:

 Lao Securities Exchange, the primary stock exchange in Laos
 LSX, the station code for Loisingha railway station, Odisha, India